Donkorkrom Presbyterian Hospital is a public hospital located in the Kwahu Afram Plains North District in the Eastern Region.

Capacity is listed as 74 beds.

See also 

 List of hospitals in Ghana

References

Review  

Hospitals in Ghana